Essostrutha is a genus of longhorn beetles of the subfamily Lamiinae, containing the following species:

 Essostrutha binotata Bates, 1881
 Essostrutha laeta (Newman, 1840)

References

Hemilophini